The National Tree is a 2009 American-Canadian made-for-television drama film by Graeme Campbell. It features Andrew McCarthy and Evan Williams as father and son on a road-trip from Oregon to Washington, D.C. transporting their own Sitka Spruce tree on a truck to be planted across from the White House on Thanksgiving. The film was produced and aired by Hallmark Channel.

Plot
Seventeen-year-old Rock Burdock (Evan Williams) wins a nationwide contest for his tree to be planted across the White House. Faith Russel (Kari Matchett), marketing representative of the company Box of Toys who is in charge of the project, visits Rock and his father Corey (Andrew McCarthy). Corey planted the tree in their garden when Rock was born. He has reservations about the idea of transporting his tree cross country, but agrees under the condition that they deliver the tree themselves. While father and son drive the truck, Faith follows them most of the time in her car. Father and son are unable to strengthen their bonding and further dissensions arise along the way. However, Rock films the entire trip on camera and posts it on his vlog. This gathers more and more fans on the internet and on the road and even causes some media coverage. Rock's internet acquaintance and love interest Katie (Paula Brancati) joins Rock on the way. Together they reach Washington, D.C. on Thanksgiving. Meanwhile, Faith's boss (Ted Atherton) secretly changed the plan. He wants to repeat the contest every year and therefore decides to erect the tree rather than planting it. After Faith's attempts to persuade her boss fail, the team now cuffs Rock to the tree and protest against its destruction. Using their media attention soon more people support their protest. Finally the President of the United States calls the Park ranger on his cell phone and tells him to plant the tree. Later Rock, Corey, Faith and Katie are invited to attend the Christmas lighting of the tree by the President.

Cast
 Andrew McCarthy as Corey Burdock
 Evan Williams as Rock Burdock
 Kari Matchett as Faith Russell
 Paula Brancati as Katie
 Jayne Eastwood as Lana
 Ted Atherton as Aaron
 Craig Eldridge as Jim
 Trent McMullen as Hank
 Vas Saranga as Ash
 Amanda Joy Lim as Ming
 Kristina Nicoll as Belinda
 Jean Daigle as Eddie
 B.J. McQueen as Trucker
 Bubba as DC Police Officer
 Joanne Reece as Secretary

Production
The film was produced on locations in the United States and Canada.

References

External links
 Official website
 
 

2009 television films
2009 films
Canadian television films
Christmas television films
English-language Canadian films
Films set in Oregon
Films set in Idaho
Films set in Nebraska
Films set in Chicago
Films set in Washington, D.C.
Films about trees
Hallmark Channel original films
Films directed by Graeme Campbell (director)
2000s Canadian films